The 2001 MTV Movie Awards were held on June 2, 2001, and were hosted by Jimmy Fallon and Kirsten Dunst. The program featured performances from Christina Aguilera, Lil' Kim, Mýa and  Pink (Moulin Rouge!), Dave Matthews Band and Weezer. Sofia Coppola was presented with an award for Best New Filmmaker. This was Aaliyah's last awards show appearance before her death two months later.

Performers 
Christina Aguilera, Lil' Kim, Mýa, and Pink — "Lady Marmalade"
Dave Matthews Band — "The Space Between"
Weezer — "Hash Pipe"

Presenters 
Shannon Elizabeth, Alyson Hannigan, Tara Reid and Mena Suvari — presented Best On-Screen Team
Ziyi Zhang and David Spade — presented Breakthrough Male
Nicole Kidman — introduced Christina Aguilera, Lil' Kim, Mýa, and Pink
Brendan Fraser and The Rock — presented Best Action Sequence
Samuel L. Jackson — presented Best Villain
Destiny's Child — presented Breakthrough Female
Aaliyah and P. Diddy — presented Best Dance Sequence
Marlon and Shawn Wayans — presented Best Female Performance
George Lucas — presented Best New Filmmaker
Jackie Chan and Chris Tucker — presented Best Fight
Johnny Knoxville and Julia Stiles — presented Best Comedic Performance
Drea de Matteo, Chris Klein and Seann William Scott — introduced Weezer
Ashton Kutcher and Christina Ricci — presented Best Kiss
Cameron Diaz and Mike Myers — presented Best Male Performance
Halle Berry, Hugh Jackman and John Travolta — presented Best Movie

Awards

Best Movie 
Gladiator
Crouching Tiger, Hidden Dragon
Erin Brockovich
Hannibal
X-Men

Best Male Performance 
Tom Cruise – Mission: Impossible 2
Russell Crowe – Gladiator
Omar Epps – Love & Basketball
Mel Gibson – The Patriot
Tom Hanks – Cast Away

Best Female Performance 
Julia Roberts - Erin Brockovich
Aaliyah – Romeo Must Die
Kate Hudson – Almost Famous
Jennifer Lopez – The Cell
Julia Stiles – Save the Last Dance

 Breakthrough Male Sean Patrick Thomas – Save the Last DanceJack Black – High Fidelity
Patrick Fugit – Almost Famous
Tom Green – Road Trip
Hugh Jackman – X-Men
Ashton Kutcher – Dude, Where's My Car?

 Breakthrough Female Erika Christensen – TrafficAaliyah – Romeo Must Die
Anna Faris – Scary Movie
Piper Perabo – Coyote Ugly
Zhang Ziyi – Crouching Tiger, Hidden Dragon

 Best On-Screen Team Drew Barrymore, Cameron Diaz and Lucy Liu (Charlie's Angels) – Charlie's AngelsRobert De Niro and Ben Stiller – Meet the Parents
George Clooney, John Turturro and Tim Blake Nelson (The Soggy Bottom Boys) – O Brother, Where Art Thou?
Tom Hanks and Wilson – Cast Away
Halle Berry, Hugh Jackman, James Marsden and Anna Paquin (the X-Men) – X-Men

 Best Villain Jim Carrey – Dr. Seuss' How the Grinch Stole ChristmasKevin Bacon – Hollow Man
Vincent D'Onofrio – The Cell
Anthony Hopkins – Hannibal
Joaquin Phoenix – Gladiator

 Best Comedic Performance Ben Stiller – Meet the ParentsJim Carrey – Me, Myself & Irene
Tom Green – Road Trip
Martin Lawrence – Big Momma's House
Eddie Murphy – Nutty Professor II: The Klumps

 Best Kiss Julia Stiles and Sean Patrick Thomas – Save the Last DanceJon Abrahams and Anna Faris – Scary Movie
Ben Affleck and Gwyneth Paltrow – Bounce
Tom Hanks and Helen Hunt – Cast Away
Anthony Hopkins and Julianne Moore – Hannibal

 Best Action Sequence Motorcycle Chase – Mission: Impossible 2Car Chase Through Construction Site – Gone in 60 Seconds
Roman Army vs. Germanic Horde – Gladiator
Plane Crash – Cast Away

 Best Dance Sequence Cameron Diaz — "Heaven Must Be Missing an Angel" (from Charlie's Angels)Kirsten Dunst, Lindsay Sloane, Clare Kramer, Nicole Bilderback, Tsianina Joelson, Rini Bell, Bianca Kajlich, Nathan West and Huntley Ritter (The Cheerleaders from Bring It On) — "I'm Sexy, I'm Cute" (from Bring It On)
Jamie Bell and Julie Walters — "Royal Ballet School" (from Billy Elliot)
Julia Stiles and Sean Patrick Thomas — "You Can Do It" (from Save the Last Dance)

 Best Musical Sequence Piper Perabo — "One Way or Another" (from Coyote Ugly)Jack Black — "Let's Get It On" (from High Fidelity)
George Clooney, Tim Blake Nelson and John Turturro — "Man of Constant Sorrow" (from O Brother, Where Art Thou?)
Breckin Meyer, Seann William Scott, Paulo Costanzo and DJ Qualls — "I Wanna Rock" (from Road Trip)
Patrick Fugit, Kate Hudson, Billy Crudup, Jason Lee and Anna Paquin — "Tiny Dancer" (from Almost Famous)

 Best Fight Zhang Ziyi vs. Entire Bar – Crouching Tiger, Hidden DragonDrew Barrymore vs. Attackers – Charlie's Angels
Russell Crowe vs. Masked Opponent and Tiger – Gladiator
Jet Li vs. Attackers – Romeo Must Die

 Best Line "Are You a Pothead, Focker?" — Robert De Niro (from Meet the Parents)"I Am a Golden God!" — Billy Crudup (from Almost Famous)
"It Vexes Me, I Am Terribly Vexed" — Joaquin Phoenix (from Gladiator)
"I Signed That Release Wavier, So You Can Just Feel Free to Stick Things in My Slot" — Cameron Diaz (from Charlie's Angels)
"Bite My Ass, Krispy Kreme" — Julia Roberts (from Erin Brockovich)

 Best Cameo James Van Der Beek – Scary MovieAndy Dick – Road Trip
Tom Green – Charlie's Angels
Ozzy Osbourne – Little Nicky
Bruce Springsteen – High Fidelity

 Best Dressed Jennifer Lopez – The CellKate Hudson – Almost Famous
Elizabeth Hurley – Bedazzled
Samuel L. Jackson – Shaft
Lucy Liu – Charlie's Angels

 Best New Filmmaker Sofia Coppola – The Virgin Suicides'''

External links
MTV Movie Awards: 2001  at the Internet Movie Database

 2001
Mtv Movie Awards
MTV Movie Awards
2001 in Los Angeles
2001 in American cinema